Mark Lawrence Taylor (born October 25, 1950) is an American actor, known for his roles in such films as Innerspace (1987), Honey, I Shrunk the Kids (1989), Arachnophobia (1990), and High School Musical 2 (2007), as well as television series like Superman (1988) and The Mask: Animated Series (1995–97).

Filmography

Film

Television

References

External links

1950 births
Living people
Male actors from Texas
American male film actors
American male television actors
American male stage actors
American male voice actors
20th-century American male actors
21st-century American male actors